The 1956–57 Mexican Segunda División was the seventh season of the Mexican Segunda División. The season started on 15 July 1956 and concluded on 20 January 1957. It was won by Zamora.

Changes 
 Monterrey was promoted to Primera División.
 Zamora was relegated from Primera División.
 Nacional de Guadalajara and Refinería Madero joined the league.
 Independiente de Toluca have dissolved.

Teams 
{{location map+ |Mexico |float=center |width=700 |caption=1956-57 Season Teams|places=

League table

Results

References 

1956–57 in Mexican football
Segunda División de México seasons